Elections were held in the organized municipalities in the Cochrane District of Ontario on October 25, 2010, in conjunction with municipal elections across the province.

Black River-Matheson

Incumbent mayor Mike Milinkovich was narrowly re-elected in Black River-Matheson, winning just 22 votes more than challenger Joanne Barber in a race that was very nearly an even three-way split. Five of the township's six councillors, Willie Dubien, Darrell Pettefer, Jerry Cashmore, Bob Renaud and Gisele Desmarais, won by acclamation; André Gadoury won over Charmaine Moffat to take the only contested council seat.

Cochrane
Peter Politis was elected mayor of Cochrane. Jane Skidmore-Fox, Robert Hutchinson, Darryl Owens, Gilles Chartrand, Bob Bawtinhimer and Christina Farquhar-Leigh were elected to council.

Fauquier-Strickland
There were no council elections in Fauquier-Strickland, as the entire council, consisting of mayor Madeleine Tremblay and councillors Gilles Fortin, Gilles Pineault, Roger Brunet and Sylvie Albert, won by acclamation.

Hearst
Incumbent mayor Roger Sigouin was re-elected in Hearst. Only two of the town's six incumbent councillors, André Rhéaume and Marc Dufresne, ran for re-election to their council seats; two councillors, Katrina Carrera and Marc Dupuis, challenged Sigouin in the mayoral race, and two incumbents did not seek re-election. Both Rhéaume and Dufresne were re-elected to council, and will be joined by new councillors Jonathan Blier, Daniel Lemaire, Conrad Morin and Gaétan Longval.

Iroquois Falls
Incumbent mayor Gilles Forget was re-elected in Iroquois Falls. Michael Shea, Tory Delaurier, Terry Boucher, Pat Britton, Gilbert Fournier and Yves Carrière were elected to council.

Kapuskasing
Incumbent mayor Alan Spacek was acclaimed back into office in Kapuskasing. Emilie Lemieux, David Plourde, Laurier Guillemette, Martin Credger, Martin Dinnissen and Yvon Guertin were elected to council.

Mattice-Val Côté
Incumbent mayor Jean-Louis Brunet was acclaimed back into office in Mattice-Val Côté; however, all of the town's incumbent councillors were defeated. The new council will consist of Michel Brier, Nathalie Lamoreaux, Richard Lemay and Réjean Mitron.

Moonbeam
Incumbent mayor Gilles Audet was re-elected in Moonbeam over challenger Henriette Lapointe.

Moosonee
Victor Mitchell defeated incumbent mayor Wayne Taipale in Moosonee. Sandra Linklater, Pauline Sackaney, Bob Gravel and Arthur McComb were elected to council.

Opasatika
In Opasatika, challenger Françoise Lambert defeated incumbent mayor Donald Nolet by just two votes. Linda Lallier, Linda Tremblay, Ghislain Doste and Aline Dallaire were elected to council.

Smooth Rock Falls
Incumbent mayor Michel Arsenault was returned by acclamation in Smooth Rock Falls. However, almost all of the town's council will be newly elected; Daniel Alie, Gratien Bernier and Joanne Landry will join returning incumbent Sue Perras.

Timmins
Incumbent mayor Tom Laughren was re-elected in Timmins.

Timmins City Council consists of eight councillors, who are elected to five wards. One councillor represents each of the rural neighbourhoods of Mountjoy, Schumacher, Porcupine and South Porcupine, while four at-large councillors represent the city's urban core.

In the council race, three of the four incumbent rural councillors were reelected; Ward 3 councillor Billy Gvozdanovic ran for re-election in the downtown ward, leaving an open seat in Schumacher. The seat was won by Noella Rinaldo, who will be the only woman on the city council in the upcoming term. Gvozdanovic was defeated in Ward 5, along with two of the ward's incumbent councillors; one other incumbent, Denis Saudino, did not run for re-election. Instead, the ward elected three new councillors, Todd Lever, Andrew Marks and Steven Black, along with incumbent councillor and former mayor Michael Doody.

Val Rita-Harty
Incumbent mayor Laurier Bourgeois was acclaimed back into office in Val Rita-Harty. Alain Tremblay, Allain Dandenault, Roger Lachance and Justin Murray were elected to council.

References

2010 Ontario municipal elections
Cochrane District